Bladenboro is a town in Bladen County, North Carolina,  United States. As of the 2010 census, the town population was 1,750.

History

Establishment and early years

Development around Bladenboro, a farming community also known in its earliest days for its turpentine and lumber, began to take off after a railroad was built through the area in 1859.  In 1885, brothers R.L. and H.C. Bridger came to Bladenboro from Little River, South Carolina, to operate a turpentine business. They soon became involved in the timber business and operated a cotton gin. The brothers and their descendants would have a major effect on the shaping of the town and its economy for much of the next century.  Major businesses, owned and operated by members of the Bridger family and which employed many area residents, have included Bridger Corporation (a farming supply company and general store no longer in operation), Bladenboro Cotton Mills (established in 1912 and later sold to become Highland Mills), and the Bank of Bladenboro (established in 1908 and now part of First Citizens Bank).

The town of Bladenboro was incorporated in 1903.

Beast of Bladenboro

In 1954, Bladenboro received national attention for several mysterious animal killings, mostly of dogs and livestock, in the area.  The animals had broken jaws and had been drained of blood in a fashion not unlike the supposed attacks of Chupacabra.  However, sightings describe the attacker as resembling a cat or wolf, which led to the local legend known as the "Beast of Bladenboro." In 2008, the History Channel television series Monster Quest performed an analysis concerning these attacks, which were beginning to happen again, and concluded that the attacker might have been a cougar.

Death of Lennon Lacy 

In August 2014, Lennon Lacy, a student attending West Bladen High School, was found dead, hanging from the frame of a swing set in the center of a mobile home community. The death was initially declared a suicide by North Carolina's Chief Medical Examiner, but Lacy's family believed that he had been lynched. Lacy, who was black, had been dating a white woman, who also believed Lacy had been murdered, and who claimed neighbors had warned her that their interracial relationship was "not right". In December 2014, the FBI announced it would investigate. In June 2016, the conclusion of the FBI investigation was announced, having found "no evidence to pursue federal criminal civil rights charges".

Recent years 
Bladenboro's downtown was heavily damaged by hurricanes Matthew and Florence.

Geography
Bladenboro is located at  (34.540461, -78.792941).

Demographics

As of the census of 2000, there were 1,718 people, 762 households, and 471 families residing in the town. The population density was 789.5 people per square mile (304.3/km2). There were 832 housing units at an average density of 382.3 per square mile (147.4/km2). The racial makeup of the town was 80.33% White, 17.81% African American, 0.93% Native American, 0.17% Pacific Islander, 0.47% from other races, and 0.29% from two or more races. Hispanic or Latino people of any race were 1.22% of the population.

There were 762 households, out of which 26.1% had children under the age of 18 living with them, 42.8% were married couples living together, 15.0% had a female householder with no husband present, and 38.1% were non-families. 36.0% of all households were made up of individuals, and 18.1% had someone living alone who was 65 years of age or older. The average household size was 2.19 and the average family size was 2.83.

In the town, the population was spread out, with 22.8% under the age of 18, 6.5% from 18 to 24, 24.9% from 25 to 44, 25.3% from 45 to 64, and 20.4% who were 65 years of age or older. The median age was 42 years. For every 100 females, there were 85.5 males. For every 100 females age 18 and over, there were 78.0 males.

The median income for a household in the town was $19,300, and the median income for a family was $30,900. Males had a median income of $28,438 versus $21,154 for females. The per capita income for the town was $15,102. About 23.2% of families and 30.0% of the population were below the poverty line, including 46.9% of those under age 18 and 23.9% of those age 65 or over.

 Estimated median house or condo value is $66,665 and the median gross rent is $622.

Notable people
 Dr. Paul V. Nolan (1923-2009), Tennessee state legislator, 1969–1970.
 Trelonnie Owens, Professional basketball player. Played college basketball at Wake Forest University. Played on the Bladenboro High School 1990 State 1A champion team. He was named the 1990 NCHSAA player of the year.

Schools

Public schools, part of the Bladen County School system, include:
Bladenboro Primary School (grades K-4)
Bladenboro Middle School (grades 5–8)
West Bladen High School (grades 9–12)

Former public schools include:
Bladenboro High School (consolidated with Tar Heel High School to form West Bladen High School)
Bladenboro Primary School (now part of Bladenboro Elementary School)
Spaulding Monroe Middle School (now part of Bladenboro Middle School)
Spaulding Monroe High School (consolidated with Bladenboro High School, which later consolidated with Tar Heel High School to form West Bladen High School)

References

Towns in North Carolina
Towns in Bladen County, North Carolina